Stortorget is a public square in Gamla Stan, the old town in central Stockholm, Sweden.

Stortorget may also refer to:
 Gustaf Adolfs torg, Gothenburg, a town square in central Gothenburg, Sweden
 Stortorget, Kalmar, the main square in Kalmar, Sweden
 Stortorget, Karlskrona, the largest square in Karlskrona, Sweden
 A square in Malmö, Sweden

See also
 Stortorvet, Oslo, Norway
 Old Great Square (Turku) (Swedish: Gamla Stortorget), in Turku, Finland